Hélène Marguerite Marie Terré (1903 - 1993) was a French resistance fighter engaged in the Free French Forces during World War II. She served in London with the French Volunteer Corps and assumed corps command from Captain Simonne Mathieu. In April 1944, she took command in France of the Army's Female Auxiliaries.

Biography 
Great-granddaughter of Hilaire Laurent Terré, Hélène was born on 26 April 1903 in Paris, the fourth and last daughter of Laurent Terré, an army commander and Jeanne Marguerite Delasalle.

Before the outbreak of World War II in France, Terré had developed a love for literature and fine books. To ensure her economic independence, Hélène created a publishing company, called "Ariel," where she worked for seven years and produced an edition of Paul Valéry's complete works for the Nouvelle Revue Française. The collaboration allowed her to work closely with the Nobel Prize nominated author. During this period, she was able to practice her artistic talents of painting and playing the violin.

Military years 
As an official at the Red Cross in France, she was sent to England in 1941 to recover medicines and vitamins for French children, she was arrested and imprisoned for three months on the initiative of Jacques Meffre, head of the security services responsible for identifying the undercover agents.

The Corps of French Volunteers (CVF) had been created in London on 7 November 1940, composed of 70 women (limited to only 100) and led by Capt. Simonne Mathieu, who was formerly the internationally known 1930s French tennis champion. As soon as news of the formation of a volunteer corps was made public, many Frenchwomen residing in England hastened to join, and it was not long before the first contingent was sent for training.

In 1941, Terré joined the CVF. By doing so, she pledged to follow the armies of Combat France in every respect, on all fronts, for the duration of the war plus three months. As a uniformed recruit, she passed the required physical training (including drills and military discipline). Some volunteers were selected for special training according to their skills and inclinations, such as office and secretarial workers, nurses, translators, interpreters, telephone operators, cooks, motor drivers, mechanics and more. In addition, there are instructional courses for those wishing to improve their English language skills. In general, the women were assigned positions replacing men who could then be sent to serve in combat units.

The volunteers' work in England could include a range of duties, as Terré wrote. "The young French speakers who were fluent in the English language were used as “messengers," others were sent to colleges in the major cities of the country to give lectures on Free France and on the conditions of existence in occupied territories. The nurses immediately had assignments as the need was great.

Terré later recalled that recruits included some English women. "English friends, we even had them in our unit: young girls who had been brought up in France, daughters of French mothers who received permission from the War Office to join us. I remember one of them to whom Junior Commander Cook asked why she was so keen to serve with the French women and the proud answer she received: 'Madame, I lived in France at the time of its splendor, ... don't you understand that I want to serve her in her distress.'"Captain Terré took command of the Corps from Captain Simonne Mathieu. General Charles de Gaulle, commander of the Free French Forces, presented the French Volunteers pennant to Terré in London, on 12 November 1942. In April 1944 she became commander of the Female Auxiliaries of the Army in France.

Post-war years 
Commander Terré completed her Army duties in 1947 after finishing assignments in Indochina and Austria.

She married Louis Bourdet who had also served in the Free French Forces and they had two children.

She coordinated exchanges between American and French educational institutions and spoke at conferences in American universities. She retired to her family's ancestral region in Plancher-Bas (Haute-Saône), in Eastern France, and became known colloquially as "Linette."

In 1990, Terré entered a Paris retirement facility where she died on 11 November 1993 at the age of 90. She was remembered at a memorial ceremony on 21 January 1994, held at the prestigious Hôtel des Invalides in Paris, which is dedicated to the military history of France. The ceremony was attended by many alumni from Free France.

Decorations 
Commander Terré was awarded several medals for her service.
Knight of the Legion of Honor
Commemorative Medal for Voluntary Services in Free France
Resistance Medal
Croix de Guerre 1939–1945
 Officer Legion of Merit (USA)

Writings 
Terré wrote about her wartime experiences in several  books and articles.

Published books
 Coucou La Goutte Plays her Part in the War. A tale for children, bilingual edition (English and French), 55 p. (25 illustrations by the author), London, Chatto & Windus, 1942
 Volunteers for France, Ministry of War, 16 p. (83 illustrations), January 1946
 Teaching in the United States, no 18, National Institute of Education, National Press, 131 p. 1963

Published articles 
 "I am still frightened of keys" (under the pseudonym of Geneviève de la Salle and in English), in Allan A. Michie and Walter Graebner (dir.), Lights of Freedom - The War in the 1st Person, ed. George Allen & Unwin (with Life Magazine ), November 1941, p. 75-90
 "The female volunteers. French forces fighting " Journal of Waterloo (district of Bedford, Quebec), 16/04/1943 ( 62nd year, no  13); a digital version is available here.
 "Friends of war," Review of Free France, no  64, January 1954(available on france-libre.net  [ archive ] )
 "The French volunteers in London," Review of Free France, no 187, August and September–October 1970, p. 31-32 (available on the website france-libre.net)

Unpublished works 
 "Haltes" (journal, 1920–1938), 74 p., Coll. go.
 "We will enter the career ... A history of AFAT", 129 p., Undated, National Archives, 72AJ238 / III; the National Archives Portal has put online a digital version of the manuscript (https://francearchives.fr/fr/facomponent/def6e4effdafd8437a3249bfbe7666c9520149d2)
 "Souvenirs ...", 29 p., Nd, coll. go.

References

External links 
 Sébastien Albertelli, They followed de Gaulle, Perrin, January 2020
 Jean-Louis Crémieux-Brilhac, La France libre, folio histoire (2 vol., 1470 p.), 2013 (Hélène Terré cited p. 115, 707 and 738)
 Jean-François Muracciole, The Free French. The Other Resistance, Tallandier, 2009 (chapter "The Forgotten of Free France: Women, Foreigners, Colonials")
 Elodie Jauneau, "The feminization of the French army during wars (1938-1962): challenges and realities of an irreversible process," thesis (Université Paris Diderot-Paris 7, dir. Gabrielle Houbre), 2011 
 Fabrice Marti, “French women in uniform. Women in love with freedom (1940-1946),” master II (Montpellier III, dir. Jean-François Muracciole)
 Janine Hoctin-Baker, "The female volunteers of Free France," 39-45 Magazine, no 118, April 1996 (p. 7-19) and Review of Free France, no 295, third quarter 1996 (p. 11-14); this article can be read on the website www.france-libre.net  [archive] published by the Fondation de la France Libre.
 Tereska Torrès, A free Frenchwoman. Journal 1939–1945, Phébus, 2007 (H. Terré cited at p. 131, 185, 205, 213, 219, 222)

Recipients of the Resistance Medal
Chevaliers of the Légion d'honneur
1993 deaths
1903 births
Military personnel from Paris
French Army personnel
French Resistance members
French women